The Ghibli Clock (officially called NI-Tele Really BIG Clock) is a large clock and sculpture designed by Hayao Miyazaki, installed outside the Nittele Tower in Tokyo, Japan. The structure is made of copper and steel.

Reception
Time Out Tokyo editors Matt Schley and Kaila Imada included the work in their 2019 list of the city's "best public art sculptures".

References

External links

 

Copper sculptures
Individual clocks
Outdoor sculptures in Tokyo
Shiodome
Steel sculptures